Alum Bank is an historic community located in Bedford County, Pennsylvania, United States. Alum Bank is the mailing address of Pleasantville Borough and surrounding rural area. It is located at an elevation of 1247 ft.

Sources
 U.S. Department of the Interior, U.S. Geological Survey, 1:62,500-scale topographic maps
 Bedford Survey, 1908
 Alumbank, Pennsylvania, Geographic Names Information System, U.S. Geological Survey.

Populated places in Bedford County, Pennsylvania